Agence Nationale de l'Aviation Civil (ANAC-Niger) is the civil aviation agency of Niger. Its head office is in Niamey.

References

External links

 Agence Nationale de l'Aviation Civil 

Government of Niger
Civil aviation in Niger
Niger
Transport organisations based in Niger